Mama Zeynab (also Romanized as Māmā Zeynāb, Mama Zeinab and Māmā Zeynab; also known as Moḩammad Zeynab and Muhammad Zainab) is a village in Sar Asiab-e Yusefi Rural District, Bahmai-ye Garmsiri District, Bahmai County, Kohgiluyeh and Boyer-Ahmad Province, Iran. At the 2006 census, its population was 321, in 60 families.

References 

Populated places in Bahmai County